
Gmina Korzenna is a rural gmina (administrative district) in Nowy Sącz County, Lesser Poland Voivodeship, in southern Poland.

The gmina contains part of the protected area called Ciężkowice-Rożnów Landscape Park.

Villages
Gmina Korzenna contains the villages and settlements of Bukowiec, Janczowa, Jasienna, Koniuszowa, Korzenna, Łęka, Lipnica Wielka, Łyczana, Miłkowa, Mogilno, Niecew, Posadowa Mogilska, Siedlce, Słowikowa, Trzycierz and Wojnarowa.

Neighbouring gminas
Gmina Korzenna is bordered by the gminas of Bobowa, Chełmiec, Ciężkowice, Gródek nad Dunajcem, Grybów and Zakliczyn.

References
Polish official population figures 2006

Korzenna
Nowy Sącz County